Ofir Drori (born 26 April 1976) is an Israeli writer and activist based in Central Africa. He started as an activist against wildlife trafficking, and expanded to anti-corruption, democracy and human rights activism throughout Africa.

Activism
He is the founder of LAGA – the Last Great Ape Organisation, an enforcement non-governmental organization that fights corruption in order to bring about to the arrests and prosecutions of major wildlife criminals dealing in endangered animal species. LAGA's award-winning model for a wildlife law enforcement NGO has started in Cameroon and is now replicated in the Republic of the Congo, the Central African Republic, and Gabon.

In 2005, based on the experience of fighting corruption in the judiciary and the forces of law and order, he has founded another NGO, called Anti Corruption in Cameroon, or AC–Cameroon, which focuses on establishing Anti-Corruption law enforcement in Cameroon, and involving citizens in the fight against corruption through direct legal action.

Drori is a co-founder of The EAGLE Network.

Crocodile attack
In December 2013, Drori was attacked by a 3-meter long Nile crocodile while vacationing along the Omo River in Ethiopia, but he managed to escape death. Despite his injuries Drori was able to survive in the wilderness for two days and reach tribesmen and eventually was evacuated to hospital in Addis Ababa, and then to a hospital in Israel. This incident is reminiscent of Australian eco-activist Val Plumwood who also survived a crocodile attack in 1985, and she subsequently wrote of it in her landmark 1996 essay "Being Prey".

Honors and awards
In 2012 he was awarded the prestigious World Wildlife Fund Duke of Edinburgh Conservation Medal for his work. He also received the Interpol Ecomessage Award, The Clark Bavin Enforcement award and the Condé Nast Traveler Environment Award for his work, as well as the Future For Nature Award and the Shining World Compassion Award.

Published works
Drori co-wrote The Last Great Ape: A Journey Through Africa and a Fight for the Heart of the Continent with David McDannald.

References 

 'Man in black' fights for Cameroon apes Man in Black Fights, BBC News, June 15, 2007
 Cameroon: Fight Against Wildlife Criminals Formalised allAfrica.com, March 2007
 Jail for Cameroon chimp trafficker BBC News, July 25, 2003
 How Saving One Chimp Led to a New Kind of Anti-Poaching Group,  National Geographic, June 2016
 African Conservation Group With Unusual Mission: Enforcement, The New York Times, October 2015
 Tedx Ede 2016

External links
 LAGA - The Last Great Ape Organization
 EAGLE Network

Israeli activists
Living people
1976 births